Rear Admiral (junior grade) Mokgadi Maphoto is a South African naval officer currently serving as Provost Marshal General of the SANDF.

Maphoto received military training with Umkhonto we Sizwe and integrated into the SANDF in 1994. He joined the Naval Police in 1995 and received his commission in 2000.

Between 2012 and 2017 he served as Senior Staff Officer Provost Services.

Education
He completed the Defence and Security Programme (SDSP) at the Máximo Gómez Command Academy in Cuba.

References

South African admirals
Living people
Year of birth missing (living people)